The earliest coin minted in today's territory of Nepal was in Shakya Mahajanapada, along the India–Nepal border at around 500 BCE. Shakya coins were an example of a coin invented in the Indian subcontinent which continued to be used in Nepal alongside India for over 1500 years.

Coins from Indian Subcontinent

Post-Maha Janapadas period (c. BCE 600–?) 

In the Maurya Empire, punch marks were widely used in the southern region of Nepal and also imported from hills and the Kathmandu valley. Mauryan coins were punch-marked with the royal standard to ascertain their authenticity.

Kushan Empire (c. CE 30–375)

Another major coinage found in Nepal was of the Kushan Empire, a syncretic empire, formed by Yuezhi in the Bactrian territories in the early 1st century CE. It spread to encompass much of Afghanistan and the northern parts of the Indian subcontinent at least as far Nepal. These coins were widely used in the Southern region of Nepal but rarely used in the hills and Kathmandu valley region. The coins depict the image of the Kushan kings and other Hindu and Buddhist deities.
Some scholars believed that Kushan King Kanishka's ascension to the throne in 78 CE marked the beginning of the Saka calendar era which was widely used later in Nepal for dating coins until 1600. However, this date is not currently regarded as the historical date of Kanishka's accession. Kanishka is estimated to have ascended the throne in AD 127 by Falk (2001).

Classical period of Nepal (c. CE 576–750)

Lichhavi Dynasty

The Licchavi Kingdom of Nepal established its root in the Kathmandu Valley from c. CE 576 to 750. This marked the beginning of the Classical period of Nepal. Lichhavi Coins were the first coins widely used in the Kathmandu Valley and its surrounding hills. Minted in copper, these coins had legends in Gupta scripts, suggesting a significant cultural influence from other major kingdoms of the Classical Period. These coins are religious in nature and few have Kings' names depicted on them. The known denominations of these coins are Pana (Tamika), Purana, Pana-Purana, Matrika out of which some were struck in cast blank flans and some were struck from cut piece. Some of the known coins are Mananka (c. CE 464-505 or 557), Amshuvermam (c. CE 557–605), Vaisravana (c. CE 621), Pashupati (c. CE 641–680), Gunanka (c. CE 625–641) and Jishnu Gupta (c. CE 622–633).
The only known conversion rate is 1 Karshapana = 16 Pana.

Medieval period (c. CE 750–1540) 
The coinage in the Medieval period of Nepal is largely unknown due to the lack of references and contemporary records about it. Scholars believe that the most likely explanation is that Tirhut and Muslim invaders from India caused the coinage system of Nepal to fail, resulting in a return to either using lumps of unstamped copper or gold dust and Islamic coins imported from India. Some inscriptions suggest that earlier Lichhavi coins (namely Pana, Purana, and Pana-Purana) were continued until the introduction of a new system by King Sivadeva/Simhadeva (c. CE 1098–1126). The only known coins of this period struck by different minor rulers are Gold Sivaka, Silver Dam and later Nava-Dam-Sivaka and a copper coin with legends Sri deva Yadasya.

Malla Dynasty (c. CE 1540–1768) 
A new coinage system developed in Nepal, especially in the Kathmandu valley and surrounding hills during the Malla (Nepal) of Nepal. These coins were struck by the sons of Yakshya Malla (c. CE 1482) in separate kingdoms of Kathmandu, Bhadgaon, Patan and by Kings of Dolakha and Gorkha. The usual design on the coins, perhaps suggested by some of Akbar's and Jahangir's issues, consists of elaborate geometrically ornamented borders surrounding a central square or circle, with the legends in Nāgarī script fitted into the spaces left in the design. On the obverse appear the king's name, titles, and date, and on the reverse various symbols, accompanied sometimes by a further title or a religious formula.

Tankas Standard

These coins were based on the designs of Muslim coins of the Delhi Sultanate, Bengal, and the Mughal Empire, which were widely circulated in Nepal by then.
Initially Struck by King Indra Simha (-1545) of Dolakha followed by King Mahendra Simha (1560–74) of Kathmandu and finally by all three Kings. Most of these coins had no names and date except the one struck by King of Patan Siddhi Narasimha in NS 759 (CE. 1639).

Mohar Standard

After a major reform in coinage, a new style of silver coins called Mohar (Initially called Mhendramalli) were struck in Nepal with a reduced weight standard of 5.4 g. in silver. All three kingdoms of the Kathmandu valley along with the Gorkha Kingdom struck these coins with little modification until after the unification of Nepal by King Prithvi Narayan Shah (1723–1775). These coins were struck in the new artistic design of Hindu-Buddhist Yantra and were struck in the denominations of  Mohar called Mohar Suki (Generally in the name of the Queen) and  Mohar called Mohar Dam. They were struck with the date in Nepal Sambat and with a date in which the issuing king was crowned rather than the date of issue.

Shah Dynasty (CE.1747–2008)

Prithvi Narayan Shah before the conquest of the Valley
Before the conquest of the Kathmandu Valley, Prithvi Narayan Shah issued coins based on the existing Malla-Mohar system. The first coin to be issued in his name was in CE. 1749, after which he issued a few coins to mark special occasions and the Unification of Nepal. Two of the few innovative difference between Shah's coin and Malla coins are that the coins are struck with the date of the issue rather than the year of coronation, and change in the dating system from Nepal Sambat to Saka era. Along with the coins issued as a king of Gorkha, a few coins from Patan were also issued in Prithivi Narayan Shah and his wife Queen Narendra Rajya Laxmi Devi's name after he was unanimously selected as a King of Patan.

After the conquest of the Valley

After the conquest of Kathmandu Valley, King Prithivi Narayan Shah withdrew all the old Malla currency and in order to stop their circulation, devalued their exchange rate. Apart from the regular issue of Mohar, Suka, dam coins were struck in queen Narendra Lakshmi's name and a new coin double in value and weight of Mohar were struck equivalent to the Indian Rupee. Some gold coins were also struck in his reign but as Nisars for use in special ceremonies. Prithivi Narayan Shah's successors continued with his modifications in Malla currency and dating system and continued issuing similar silver and Nisar gold coins in their and their queens' names. In 1789 (Sak.1711) King Rana Bahadur Shah reduced the diameter of Mohar and increased the production of smaller denominations and gold coins.

Regent Queen
Several Suki coins were issued by the Regent Queens of Shah dynasty due to a power shift in the court. In Sak.1722 Queen Raj Rajeshwari Devi senior wife of Rana Bahadur Shah issued her own suki currency as a regent of infant King Girvan Yuddha Bikram Shah followed by her successor regent Suwarna Prabha Devi (Sak.1723). Followed by Raja Rajeshwari Devi again in Sak.1724 and Probably with different names (Amar Rajeshwari and Mahamaheshwari).

Copper coinage in Valley
In CE. 1865, the first copper coins were issued for the Kathmandu Valley in the denomination of Copper Paisa, Double Paisa and Dam with inscription in Devanagari script.

System

Tanka standard
1 Tanka
  Tanka
  Tanka  =  4 Dam
1 Dam  =  4 Jawa

Silver Mohar system (after 1640)
Double Rupee = 4 Mohar
1 Rupee /Double Mohar  = 2 Mohar
1 Mohar  =   2 Suka
1  Suka    =   6.25 Aana
1 Aana  =   2  Adha-aana
1 Adha-aana     =  2  paisa
1 Paisa Mohar =   4 Dams
1 Dam     =   4 Jawa

Copper standard
1 Ganda or Ani/Aana  =  2 Dyak or 2 Double Paisa
1  Dyak or 1  Double Paisa  =  2 Dhebua or 2 Paisa
1 Dhebua/Paisa  =  4 Dam (Copper)

Gold coin system

Duitole Asarfi  =  4 Mohar  =  2 Tolas  =  360 troy grains
Bakla Asarfi  =  2 Mohar  =  1 Tola  =  180 troy grains
Patla/Majhawala  Asarfi  =  1 Mohar  =   Tola  =  90 troy grains
Suka Asarfi  =    Mohar=   Tola  =  45 troy grains
Suki  =    Mohar=   Tola  =  22.5 troy grains
Ani  =    Mohar   =    Tola  =  2.93 troy grains
Adha-Ani  =    Mohar   =   Tola  =  5.87 troy grains
Pal  =     Mohar   =   Tola  =  2.93 troy grains
Dam  =     Mohar  =   Tola   =  0.71 troy grains

Gallery

See also

 Historical money of Tibet

External links

References

Nepal